The 2018–19 Liga MX season  (known as the Liga BBVA Bancomer MX for sponsorship reasons) was the 72nd professional season of the top-flight football league in Mexico. The season was split into two championships—the Torneo Apertura and the Torneo Clausura—each in an identical format and each contested by the same eighteen teams.

Teams, stadiums, and personnel 
The following eighteen teams competed this season. Lobos BUAP was initially  relegated to the Ascenso MX after accumulating the lowest point coefficient last season, but instead they will continue to compete in the Liga MX after the 2017–18 Ascenso MX champion, Cafetaleros de Tapachula, who won promotion after defeating Alebrijes de Oaxaca, was not certified to be promoted. Lobos BUAP paid MXN$120 million to be disbursed to Cafetaleros de Tapachula and remain in Liga MX.

Stadiums and locations

Personnel and kits

Managerial changes

Torneo Apertura

Regular season 
The Apertura 2018 was the first championship of the season. The regular season began on 20 July 2018 and ended on 25 November 2018. The defending champions were Santos Laguna, having won their sixth title.

Standings

Positions by round 
The table lists the positions of teams after each week of matches. In order to preserve chronological evolvements, any postponed matches were not included in the round at which they were originally scheduled, but added to the full round they were played immediately afterwards. For example, if a match was scheduled for matchday 13, but then postponed and played between days 16 and 17, it was added to the standings for day 16.

Results

Regular season statistics

Top goalscorers 
Players sorted first by goals scored, then by last name.

Source: Liga MX

Top assists 
Players sorted first by assists, then by last name.

Source: Soccerway

Hat-tricks 

4 Player scored four goals

Attendance

Per team

Highest and lowest 

Source: Liga MX

Liguilla – Apertura

Bracket 

 Teams were re-seeded each round.
 Team with more goals on aggregate after two matches advanced.
 Away goals rule was applied in the quarter-finals and semi-finals, but not the final.
 In the quarter-finals and semi-finals, if the two teams were tied on aggregate and away goals, the higher seeded team advanced.
 In the final, if the two teams were tied after both legs, the match went to extra time and, if necessary, a shoot-out.
 Both finalists qualified to the 2020 CONCACAF Champions League (champions as MEX1, runners-up as MEX3).

Quarter-finals

Semi-finals

Finals

Torneo Clausura 
The Clausura 2019 was the second championship of the season. The tournament began on 4 January 2019 ended on 26 May 2019. América were the defending champions, having won their 13th league title the previous tournament.

Regular season

Standings

Positions by round 
The table lists the positions of teams after each week of matches. In order to preserve chronological evolvements, any postponed matches were not included in the round at which they were originally scheduled, but added to the full round they were played immediately afterwards. For example, if a match was scheduled for matchday 13, but then postponed and played between days 16 and 17, it was added to the standings for day 16.

Results

Regular season statistics

Top goalscorers 
Players sorted first by goals scored, then by last name.

Source: Liga MX

Top assists 
Players sorted first by assists, then by last name.

Source: Soccerway

Hat-tricks

Attendance

Per team

Highest and lowest 

Source: Liga MX

Liguilla – Clausura

Bracket 

 Teams were re-seeded each round.
 Team with more goals on aggregate after two matches advanced.
 Away goals rule was applied in the quarter-finals and semi-finals, but not the final.
 In the quarter-finals and semi-finals, if the two teams were tied on aggregate and away goals, the higher seeded team advanced.
 In the final, if the two teams were tied after both legs, the match went to extra time and, if necessary, a shoot-out.
 Both finalists qualified to the 2020 CONCACAF Champions League (champions as MEX2, runners-up as MEX4).

Quarter-finals

Semi-finals

Finals

Relegation table

Aggregate table 
The aggregate table (the sum of points of both the Apertura and Clausura tournaments) was used to determine the participants of the 2019–20 Copa MX. This table also displays teams that qualified for the 2020 CONCACAF Champions League.

Notes

See also 
2018–19 Ascenso MX season
2018–19 Liga MX Femenil season

References

External links 
 Official website of Liga MX

 
Mx
1
Liga MX seasons